Richard Atkinson may refer to:
Richard C. Atkinson (born 1929), American psychologist and former president of the University of California
Richard J. C. Atkinson (1920–1994), British prehistorian and archaeologist
Richard Merrill Atkinson (1894–1947), U.S. Representative from Tennessee
Richard Atkinson (bishop) (born 1958), British Anglican bishop
Rick Atkinson (born 1952), American journalist and author
Ricky Atkinson (born 1965), American footballer

See also
Dick Atkinson, Australian rules footballer